Johan Holberg (20 February 1893 – 8 April 1978, Chicago) was an Estonian politician. From 1927 to 1928, he was minister of commerce and industry. After the Second World War, he lived in Toronto, Canada, as prime minister of the Estonian government in exile.

References

1893 births
1978 deaths
People from Tori Parish
People from Kreis Pernau
Estonian Lutherans
Farmers' Assemblies politicians
Government ministers of Estonia
Members of the Riigikogu, 1923–1926
Members of the Riigikogu, 1926–1929
Members of the Riigikogu, 1929–1932
Members of the Riigikogu, 1932–1934
Members of the Estonian National Assembly
Members of the Riiginõukogu
Saint Petersburg State University alumni
University of Tartu alumni
Russian military personnel of World War I
Estonian military personnel of the Estonian War of Independence
Recipients of the Cross of Liberty (Estonia)
Recipients of the Order of Lāčplēsis
Estonian World War II refugees
Estonian emigrants to the United States